Folweni High School is a public state high school in the A-section of Folweni in KwaZulu-Natal, South Africa. It is located south west of Durban.

References

Schools in KwaZulu-Natal
High schools in South Africa